Nasr ol Din (also Romanized as Naşr ol Dīn and Naşr od Dīn; also known as Nasradi, Nasreddin, and Nasredī) is a village in Gazik Rural District, Gazik District, Darmian County, South Khorasan Province, Iran. At the 2006 census, its population was 546, in 119 families.

References 

Populated places in Darmian County